Wink of an Eye is a 1958 American comedy film directed by Winston Jones and written by James Edmiston. The film stars Jonathan Kidd, Doris Dowling, Barbara Turner, Irene Seidner, Jaclynne Greene and Wally Brown. The film was released in June 1958, by United Artists.

Plot
Meek, henpecked Alvin Atterbury is a chemist for a perfume factory. Unhappy at home and work, he begins keeping company with a co-worker, Myrna Duchane. He spends a great deal of time at home doing experiments in his basement.

Atterbury's wife disappears one day. A lodger, law student Judy Carlton, arrives unexpectedly, having been rented a room by Atterbury's wife. Judy and a neighbor, Mrs. Lazlow, both begin to suspect foul play in Mrs. Atterbury's absence and express concerns to Cantrick, the town sheriff.

Denying that anything is occurring in his cellar except work-related research, Atterbury is cleared of suspicion when his wife suddenly returns, having been away at a sanitarium. But as soon as all suspicions are averted, Atterbury begins to concoct a new experiment.

Cast 
Jonathan Kidd as Alvin Atterbury
Doris Dowling as Myrna Duchane
Barbara Turner as Judy Carlton
Irene Seidner as Mrs. Lazlow
Jaclynne Greene as Mrs. Atterbury
Wally Brown as Sheriff Cantrick
Taylor Holmes as Mr. Vanryzin
Max Rich as Max
Paul Smith as Ben Lazlow
Jack Grinnage as Delivery Boy
Lucien Littlefield as Old Man
Rodney Bell as Rand
Dick Nelson as Butler
Sam E. Levin as Trumpet player
Howard Roberts as Guitar player
Henry Slate as Attendant
Thomas Browne Henry as Mr. Hix

References

External links 
 

1958 films
Films scored by Ernest Gold
United Artists films
American comedy films
1958 comedy films
1950s English-language films
1950s American films